Ghetto Dope is the debut studio album by American hip hop group 5th Ward Boyz. It was released in May 1993 through a joint venture between O.G. Dewey Forker's Underground Records and J. Prince's Rap-A-Lot Records with distribution via Priority Records. Recording sessions took place at Jungle Style Studios and at Digital Services in Houston. Production was handled by John Bido, Mike Dean, N.O. Joe, and J. Prince, who also was serving as executive producer together with Edward Russell and O.G. Dewey. It features guest appearances from Bushwick Bill, Devin the Dude and Scarface. Member Richard "Lo Life" Nash was absent on the project due to his imprisonment.

The album peaked at number 176 on the Billboard 200, number 19 on the Top R&B/Hip-Hop Albums and number 26 on the Top Heatseekers. Its lead single, "Thanks for the Blessing", did not made it to the Billboard charts.

Track listing

Personnel
Andre "007" Barnes – main performer
Eric "E-Rock" Taylor – main performer
Brad Jordan – rap vocals (track 3)
James A. Smith – voice (track 11), producer, executive producer
Richard Stephen Shaw – rap vocals (track 14)
Devin Copeland – vocals (track 14)
Michael George Dean – producer, mixing, mastering, engineering
John Okuribido – producer, mixing
Joseph Johnson – producer, mixing
John Moran – mastering
"O.G. Dewey" Forker – executive producer
Edward Russell – executive producer
Leroy Robinson, Jr. – art direction, design

Charts

References

External links

1993 debut albums
5th Ward Boyz albums
Priority Records albums
Rap-A-Lot Records albums
Albums produced by N.O. Joe
Albums produced by Mike Dean (record producer)